Victor Arhip is a Moldovan and Russian professional rugby union player who plays for Krasny Yar.

Background
Victor Arhip was born in Chișinău where he lived until the age of 17. At the age of 15 he started playing rugby.

Club career
He played in Moldova until the age of 18. Then he moved to Romania where he played for a number of Romanian teams. In 2011 he moved to Russia to play for Enisey-STM. At the end of 2013 he signed a contract with Krasny Yar.

International career
Victor Arhip played 25 matches for Moldova. In November 2021 according to new naturalisation rules provided by World Rugby Arhip chose Russia national team for further international career. in January 2022 he was called up for the first training camp.

Personal life
Victor's older brother Dmitri also plays rugby. Victor Arhip is married and has a son and a daughter.

References

External links
 Itsrugby profile
 EPCR profile

1990 births
Living people
Moldovan rugby union players
Rugby union locks